"Coronao Now" is a song by Dominican urban artist El Alfa  with Colombian-American rapper Lil Pump. It was released on November 7, 2019. The single reached a peak position of 31 on the Billboard Hot Latin Songs chart.

A remix version was released with Vin Diesel, Sech and Myke Towers.

Music video 
The music video was recorded in Santo Domingo, Dominican Republic, and has surpassed 100 million views.

Charts

References

2019 songs
2019 singles
Lil Pump songs
El Alfa songs